XY, or xy,  or any of its variants may refer to:

Entertainment
 XY (magazine), a gay male youth magazine that also operated a personals website
"XY", the first episode of the eighth season of Castle TV series
 X, Y, a novel by Michael Blumlein
 X&Y, a 2005 album by Coldplay
 X+Y, 2014 British film
 X/Y, 2014 American film
 X & Y (film), 2018 Swedish film
 Xy, a member of the band Samael
 Aktenzeichen XY… ungelöst, a German television program first broadcast in 1967
 Kyle XY, American sci-fi television series
 Pokémon X and Y, 2013 role-playing video games
Pokemon The Series: XY, 17th season of Pokémon and the first and titular season of Pokémon the Series: XY, first aired in 2013; named after the games
 XY Chelsea, a 2019 American-British documentary film about Chelsea Manning

Other uses
 -coordinates, a system used to locate a point in two dimensions according to the cartesian coordinate system
 XY model, in physics
 XY communication problem in help desk, customer service situations
 XY sex-determination system, in many species of animal
 Male, an organism producing sperm gametes that fuse with the female gamete during sexual reproduction, typically having one X and one Y chromosome
 XY gonadal dysgenesis, also known as Swyer syndrome, a type of hypogonadism resulting in a phenotypical female with functionless gonads
 Xy (digraph), a digraph of the Romanized Popular Alphabet, used to write Hmong
 XY, aircraft registration prefix for Myanmar

See also
 YX (disambiguation)
 Xyz (disambiguation)